Eilema okiensis is a moth of the subfamily Arctiinae. It is found in Japan.

References

 Natural History Museum Lepidoptera generic names catalog

okiensis